Horace Walter Nicholls (17 February 1867 – 28 July 1941) was an English photographer, notable as a war photographer during World War I.

Life and work
Nicholls was born in Cambridge, the son of Charlotte (née Johnson) and Arthur N. Nicholls, a professional photographer. Nicholls was apprenticed to his photographer father on the Isle of Wight and in Huddersfield before setting up as a professional photographer in Johannesburg. During the Second Boer War he worked for the London-based periodical South Africa.

Nicholls returned to England as a freelance, specialising in pictures of social and sporting events for magazines such as The Tatler, The Illustrated London News and Black and White, being one of the first photographers to make a living from documentary photography. Nicholls photographed Dorothy Levitt, the first British woman racing driver, and his images were used to illustrate her book The Woman and the Car initially published in 1909.

During World War I, Nicholls initially worked as a freelance photographer. In 1917, he was appointed Home Front Official Photographer by the forerunner of the Ministry of Information. His appointment coincided with the death in action of his eldest son on the Western Front.  Nevertheless, Nicholls, together with George P. Lewis, spent the rest of the war photographing its impact on the British people.  His work of this period includes numerous photographs of women's contribution to the war effort.  At the end of the war, Nicholls joined the newly established Imperial War Museum as its first chief photographer.  In this capacity, he photographed the interment of the Unknown Warrior in Westminster Abbey, and the unveiling of the Cenotaph in Whitehall in addition to the early years of the Museum's early years in the Crystal Palace and South Kensington Galleries.  Nicholls continued to work in this capacity until his retirement in 1936.  Horace Nicholls had five children, including noted character actor Anthony Nicholls (with Florence Holderness). He died of diabetes on 28 July 1941.

Nicholls' early work – some 1268 photographs – is held in The Royal Photographic Society's Collection at the National Media Museum, Bradford. His First World War photography, comprising some 1,500 photographs, is held by Imperial War Museums, London. Other work is retained by members of his family.

References
Citations

Bibliography

External links

1867 births
1941 deaths
Artists from Cambridge
Deaths from diabetes
Photographers from Cambridgeshire
War photographers